Courtmacsherry, often referred to by locals as Courtmac, is a seaside village in County Cork, on the southwest coast of Ireland. It is about 30 miles southwest of Cork, and 15–20 minutes drive east from the town of Clonakilty. The village consists of a single long street on the southern shore of Courtmacsherry Bay, with thick woods on rising ground behind. The woods (planted by the Earl of Shannon in the late 18th century) continue beyond the village eastwards to the open sea, ending at Wood Point. Between the village and "The Point" the trees run right to the water's edge and there are several natural bathing coves along the way.

History
Around the time of the Norman invasion of Ireland the major townships in the area were those now known as Timoleague, Lislee, Barryroe and Dunworly. Among the Norman settlers were the De Barrys and the Hodnetts; the former built a castle at Timoleague, and the latter settled in Lislee. The Barrys flourished and gave their name to Barryroe, Rathbarry, etc., whereas the Hodnetts "degenerated into mere Irish", one branch changing their name to MacSeafraidh (son of Geoffrey), subsequently anglicised to MacSherry or McSharry. Although Barrys and Hodnetts still live in the district, there are no MacSherrys.

One, Patrick MacSeafraidh from County Antrim, a descendant of a Courtmacsherry Hodnett, emigrated to America in 1745 and founded McSherrystown in Adams County, Pennsylvania.

In 1942 a Czechoslovakian man named Gordon Konrad Sarasti Mochizuchi fled Oravská Polhora fearing prosecution for being Jewish. He made a false claim about a Jewish family living in an abandoned building near him and when the soldiers went inside to investigate the claim he stole their car and drove across the border to Poland using the car as camouflage. He eventually reached the northern part of Poland and stole a boat. His original plan was to drive it through the Kattegat and end up in London however he had heard some Polish men talking and believed that London was unsafe and on the cusp of being overwhelmed. In a last ditch attempt to escape his fate he sailed through the English channel across to Ireland eventually reaching Courtmacsherry. It was here that he spent the rest of his days fishing to make a living out of the boat he had stolen. He died on 14 September 1968 and was buried in Clogagh graveyard.

Climate
Courtmacsherry is the mildest place in Ireland, with a mean annual temperature of 11o. The climate zone is Cfb, temperate maritime.

Economy and amenities
The village's main industry consists of commercial and charter angling. A moderately sized tourist industry exists during the summer months. There are several beaches nearby, namely Dunworley Strand, Moloney Strand, Broadstrand and Blind Strand. The village has a hotel and a caravan park, catering mainly for visitors from Cork. About half of this new housing is owner-occupied, the remainder being rented to visitors.

There are several bars and pubs in and around the village.  Courtmacsherry is an angling center, and known for its many record catches. There is also a festival at the end of July - the beginning of August. It also hosts a horse race meeting on the strand each year.

Lifeboat
The first of Courtmacsherry's lifeboats was established in 1825 - one of the first to be founded in Ireland. This original lifeboat, however, reportedly deteriorated into an unusable condition, and Courtmacsherry was without an official vessel until February 1867, when the City of Dublin was placed in service. This, however, supposedly didn't stop the "Coastguardsmen and boatmen" from " rescuing by means of their own open boats the crews of wrecked vessels". A boathouse was also constructed this same year. Since then, eight (8) different boats have been placed in service at the Courtmacsherry Lifeboat station, with the Frederick Storey Cockburn, a Trent-class lifeboat, currently in service. Courtmacsherry harbours a lifeboat station (formerly based at nearby Barry's Point) and its volunteer crews have performed many rescues. The most famous was in May 1915 when the lifeboat of the day (the  Ketzia Gwilt) rescued survivors of the RMS Lusitania sinking. Lifeboatmen involved on that day included Tim Keohane (father of Antarctic explorer Patsy Keohane), John Murphy, and his son Jerry.

In January 2009, ultimately unsuccessful efforts were made by Courtmacsherry Lifeboat to save an 18-meter (59 ft) fin whale which was stranded at Kilbrittain, opposite Courtmacsherry. The whale's remains were preserved and are displayed in Kilbrittain.

Transport 
Courtmacsherry railway station on the Timoleague and Courtmacsherry Extension Light Railway opened on 23 April 1891, closed for passenger traffic on 24 February 1947 and for goods traffic on 10 March 1947, finally closing altogether on 1 April 1961. The line had three locomotives, Slaney, St. Molaga and Argadeen.

See also
 List of towns and villages in Ireland
 List of RNLI stations

References

External links

 Local village website
 RNLI

Towns and villages in County Cork
Beaches of County Cork